Gjerdrum Idrettslag is a Norwegian sports club from Gjerdrum, Akershus. It has sections for association football, team handball, alpine skiing, Nordic skiing, biathlon, floorball and volleyball.

It was founded as Gjerdrum IF on 25 January 1920. In August 1940 it merged with the AIF club Gjerdrum AIL to form Gjerdrum IL.

The men's football team currently plays in the Third Division, the fourth tier of football in Norway. Its only stint at the third tier came in 1988.

Members of the skiing section include the 2014 Olympic cross-country sprint champion Maiken Caspersen Falla.

References

External links
 Official site 
 Official site, football section 

Football clubs in Norway
Sport in Akershus
Gjerdrum
Sports clubs established in 1920
1920 establishments in Norway